C. Abdul Hakeem College is a government aided private college for arts and science located in Melvisharam, Tamil Nadu, India. It is one of the oldest colleges in Ranipet district, affiliated to Thiruvalluvar University. The National Assessment and Accreditation Council has conferred A grade. Currently it offers 31 Courses at Under-Graduate level, 6 Courses at Post-Graduate level and Ph.D. programs. It was granted autonomous status by University Grants Commission with effect from 2014–2015 to 2019–2020.

History
The C. Abdul Hakeem College was established in the year 1965 by the Melvisharam Muslim Educational Society (MMES) which was founded in 1918 by Late Nawab C. Abdul Hakeem. He was a businessman, philanthropist, one of the natives of Melvisharam and one time Sheriff of Madras. MMES started off with Primary, Secondary and Higher Education for people irrespective of caste, creed, community or social status. Presently, MMES manages 11 institutions from kindergarten school to a first grade college with five postgraduate departments and three research departments. They include M.M.E.S. arts and science college for women and C. Abdul Hakeem College of Engineering & Technology.

The college was instituted in the year 1965 with just Pre-University Course, in the local orphanage buildings.

Campus
The college has a double story building with different blocks which accommodate all the class rooms, office rooms, principal's chambers, separate staff rooms for various departments, laboratories, toilets, etc. Although there are sizable number of academic departments, the facilities are mostly shared. There is an auditorium which is also used for social, cultural, academic and government sponsored programs. A branch of the Centurion Bank with ATM facility is located in the nearby campus of the engineering college run by the same management. A sub-post office is functioning in the college campus. Although the institution is four decades old, the open land is to be fully converted into gardens or other useful buildings. Significant amount of rainwater is harvested using rainwater harvesting facility.

Courses

Government aided courses

Undergraduate programs 
Bachelor of Arts in History
Bachelor of Commerce Corporate Secretaryship
Bachelor of Commerce
Bachelor of Science in Mathematics
Bachelor of Science in Physics
Bachelor of Science in Chemistry
Bachelor of Science in Zoology

Postgraduate programs 
 Master of Arts, History
Master of Science in Mathematics
Master of Science in Zoology
Master of Science in Chemistry
Master of Commerce

Self-financing courses 
Undergraduate programs
Bachelor of Science, Computer Science
Bachelor of Computer Application
Bachelor of Science, Bio-Chemistry
Bachelor of Commerce
Bachelor of Business Administration
Bachelor of Science in Zoology

Postgraduate programs 
 Master of Arts, History
Master of Science, Bio-Technology
Master of Philosophy, Mathematics
Master of Philosophy, Commerce
Master of Philosophy, History
Master of Philosophy, Chemistry
Master of Philosophy, Zoology
Ph.D, Zoology
Ph.D, History

Examinations
The exams are conducted as per Thiruvalluvar University exam regulations and codes. The question papers are drafted by the affiliated university and the answer papers are evaluated by a common evaluation method.

Research and development
The college houses Aquatic Animal Health Laboratory the first OIE Reference Laboratory in India for white tail diseases primarily caused by White spot syndrome virus. Research is also done in the areas of materials, polymer chemistry, biodiversity, and other science topics.

Student life
The college has three National Service Scheme (NSS) units with 155 cadets. These NSS units are subjected to community development, social work, health and hygiene awareness, medical camp, adult education and literacy, blood donation camp, AIDS awareness, environment awareness, etc. Three villages have been adopted for executing extension activities. The extension activities are planned and executed in collaboration with governmental organizations including the District Collectorate, District Employment office, District Industries Centre, Public Health Department, Police Department, Pollution Control Board, Town Panchayaths and NGOs.

Students have participated and won in several academic competitions and sports events. A number of other student clubs also exist to engage students in extra-curricular and co-curricular activities. So of them are,
Tamil Association
English Association
Computer Association
Mathematics Association
Physics Association
Commerce & Accountancy Association

See also
 List of universities in India
 Universities and colleges in India
 Education in India
 University Grants Commission (India)
 List of Tamil Nadu Government's Educational Institutions

References

External links
 Official website
 Controller of Examinations

Universities and colleges in Vellore district
Education in Vellore
Educational institutions established in 1965
1965 establishments in Madras State
Colleges affiliated to Thiruvalluvar University
Academic institutions formerly affiliated with the University of Madras